Creighton is an unincorporated community in Volusia County, Florida, United States. It is situated on a former railroad station near the Farmton State Wildlife Management Area. Today, it is a rural community near Interstate 95. There are two roads that lead to Creighton; Volco Road and Cow Creek Road, accessible from either CR 4147 or SR 442.

History
The community was named after E. R. Creighton, who owned a mill there in 1911.

References

Unincorporated communities in Volusia County, Florida
Unincorporated communities in Florida